Daze is a Danish Eurodance band whose 1997 debut album Super Heroes became a double platinum international hit. The band is a trio composed of Lucas Sieber, Jesper Tønnov, and Trine Bix, and their style of "zany" "turbo-pop" music is compared to the Danish-Norwegian pop band Aqua. Super Heroes, initially published in Scandinavia by Sony Music, sold 31,000 copies on the release day and was later released in the United States by Columbia Records and in Non-Nordic global territories by Epic Records. Hit singles included "Superhero", "Tamagotchi" and "Toy Boy". In February 1998, Daze won the Danish Grammy Award for Best Dance Album of 1997. The single Superhero was nominated as 1997 Danish hit of the year by G.A.F.F.A. magazine. It was also very famous in Argentina during those years.

In 2012, Daze announced on their official Facebook page that their new single would be called "Fool Me". On 23 June 2012 the new single was released to digital music stores such as iTunes and Spotify in Europe along with an extended mix. It also features Daze's original band logo that was dropped after the release of "Super Heros" in the late 90s and replaced by the flame logo. An international release date is expected soon.

The band's music is inspired by Aqua, Dr. Alban and Herbie Crichlow.

In 2013, Daze competed in the Dansk Melodi Grand Prix selection in Denmark for a place in the Eurovision Song Contest with their song "We Own the Universe".

Discography

Albums
1997 - Super Heroes
1999 - They Came To Rule

Singles

 Originally released in 1997 with the title "Tamagotchi", it peaked at number 44.

References

External links
Daze biography at The Eurodance Encyclopedia website
Daze at Bubblegum Dancer

Danish dance music groups
Musical groups established in 1997
Danish Eurodance groups
Danish musical trios
Danish pop music groups